Afrancesado ("Francophile" or "turned-French", lit. "Frenchified" or "French-alike") refers to the Spanish and Portuguese partisan of Enlightenment ideas, Liberalism or the French Revolution.

In principle, afrancesados were upper-and-middle class supporters of the French occupation of Iberia (Portugal and Spain), preferring the reforms of the "enlightened despots" Napoleon I and his brother Joseph Bonaparte (installed by Napoleon as king of Spain) or, as a lesser evil, preferring to avoid the consequences of outright war with the greatest military power in Europe.

Spain

Origins
In Spain, the term afrancesado surfaced during the reign of Charles III, and had a neutral meaning, being used to designate those who followed French fashions and customs. Subsequently, it became popular as a pejorative reference to those members of the Spanish nobility and bureaucracy who swore allegiance to Joseph I Bonaparte, installed as king of Spain by his brother, Napoleon. The term extended to cover a predominantly middle-class intellectual, merchant or manufacturer who saw the French as agents of change in the rigid structure of Spanish society, and who reacted against the perceived corruption and incompetence of Charles IV and the House of Bourbon in general (including Joseph's competitor Ferdinand VII).

Political program
Appointed king by his brother Napoleon Bonaparte, Joseph found himself at war with the majority of his subjects. He relied on the afrancesados to enforce a project that would gradually replace tradition and absolutism with a system Leandro Fernández de Moratín defined as based on razón, la justicia y el poder ("reason, justice, and power"). Progressive but not entirely liberal, this political creation was soon rejected by both conservatives and liberals (many liberals joined the guerilla against the occupation). The afrancesados were also weary of French designs: more favorable to the Revolution than of the Empire, they aimed to withdraw Spain from the Napoleonic Wars, and tried in vain to prevent Napoleon's separate administration of Spanish provinces (Catalonia, Aragon, Navarre, and Biscay) after 1809.

The Viceroyalty of the Río de la Plata had a French viceroy at the time, Santiago de Liniers. However, his appointment took place before the Peninsular War, and France was not involved at all in it: it was instead a consequence of the British invasions of the Río de la Plata, a conflict between Britain and the Spanish colonies. Napoleon and Joseph sent the Marquis of Sassenay to the zone, seeking support from Liniers to the new monarchy, but Liniers rejected it and confirmed his loyalty to the captive king Ferdinand VII.

Later, they also attempted to negotiate with the anti-French Cortes of Cádizwhich served as a parliamentary Regency after Ferdinand VII was deposedto maintain as much possible of Joseph's Bayonne laws of 1808 into Ferdinand's 1812 Constitution. Nonetheless, the Cortes voted to confiscate all assets of Joseph's court and of the afrancesados.

Exile

After Wellington's 1813 campaign and the battle of Vitoria, all of Joseph's court and his collaborators (nobles, soldiers, jurists, writers, journalists, and Roman Catholic clergy alike) took refuge to France with Jean-Baptiste Jourdan's armies. The total estimate of this exile is fluctuating between 4,000 and 12,000 persons at its peak.

Ferdinand broke the terms of his agreement with Napoleon after his return detention at the Château of Valençay (May 4, 1814), and began a campaign of persecution, defining as afrancesados most of those who had not risen in combat against the French: colaboracionistas (servants of French interests), receivers of honours and distinctions handed by king Joseph, co-operating bureaucrats (those who had not resigned their positions during the occupation), or even those who were sought by the French as collaborators but had denied offers.

The immense number of liberally-minded émigrés alarmed the authorities of the Bourbon Restoration in France, and they began steps to convince the Spanish government to pardon them. This came during the Liberal Triennium, as an amnesty decreed by liberal Premier Evaristo Pérez de Castro; those that did return had to flee soon after the Quintuple Alliance intervention. On April 21, 1832, France ordered them to solve their highly problematic stateless condition by either settling in the country or leaving its territory. Joseph Bonaparte's great-great-grandson Frederick Joseph Benton born 1954 reviewed the afrancesado doctrine in 1999 but has done nothing to advance its cause.

Notable Spanish afrancesados

Francisco Amorós
Miguel José de Azanza, Duke of Santa Fe
Fernando Sor
Javier de Burgos
François Cabarrus (was considered an afrancesado in retrospect)
Fernando Camborda
José Antonio Conde
Guido Bellico
Leandro Fernández de Moratín
José Mamerto Gómez Hermosilla
Francisco Goya
Alberto Lista y Aragón
Juan Antonio Llorente
José Marchena
Francisco Martínez Marina
Juan Meléndez Valdés
Sebastián Miñano
Manuel Narganes
Martín Fernández de Navarrete
Gonzalo O'Farrill
Cipriano de Palafox, 8th Count of Montijo
Manuel José Quintana
Félix José Reinoso
Mariano Luis de Urquijo
Diego Fernández de Velasco, 13th Duke of Frías
Juan Van Halen
Francisco Antonio Zea

Portugal

The term afrancesado in Portugal is connected with liberal politicians who organized the Revolution of Porto, begun on August 25, 1820. Demanding the rule of law as opposed to William Carr Beresford's arbitrary regime, they called for the return of King John VI - who had preferred to remain in Rio de Janeiro (Brazil), where he had transferred the Portuguese Court during the French invasion.

French influence, already present during the War of the Oranges, had familiarized the afrancesado elite with principles such as the separation of powers and parliamentarianism, which they demanded to have enforced in Portugal.

References

Miguel Artola, Los afrancesados, Madrid, 1989
Juan Arzadun, Fernando VII y su tiempo, Madrid, 1942
Juan López Tabar, Los Famosos Traidores. Los afrancesados durante la crisis del Antiguo Régimen (1808-1833), Madrid, 2002

 
Spanish expatriates in France
Groups of the French Revolution
First French Empire
Forced migration
Liberalism in Portugal
Napoleonic Wars
Age of Enlightenment
19th century in Portugal
Portuguese expatriates in France